National Bank for Agriculture and Rural Development (NABARD) is an apex regulatory body for overall regulation of regional rural banks and apex cooperative banks in India. It is under the jurisdiction of Ministry of Finance, Government of India. The bank has been entrusted with "matters concerning policy, planning, and operations in the field of credit for agriculture and other economic activities in rural areas in India". NABARD is active in developing and implementing financial inclusion.

Background
Source:

NABARD was established on the recommendations of B. Sivaramman Committee (by Act 61, 1981 of Parliament) on 12 July 1982 to implement the National Bank for Agriculture and Rural Development Act 1981. It replaced the Agricultural Credit Department (ACD) and Rural Planning and Credit Cell (RPCC) of Reserve Bank of India, and Agricultural Refinance and Development Corporation (ARDC). It is one of the premier agencies providing Rs.14080 crore (100% share). The authorized share capital is Rs.30,000 crore.

International associates of NABARD include World Bank-affiliated organisations and global developmental agencies working in the field of agriculture and rural development. These organisations help NABARD by advising and giving monetary aid for the upliftment of the people in the rural areas and optimising the agricultural process.

NABFOUNDATION has been set up by NABARD as a section 8 or subsidiary company, where the chairman of NABARD is the chairman of NABFOUNDATION too.

Role

NABARD has been instrumental in grounding rural, social innovations and social enterprises in the rural hinterlands. As of May 2020, NABARD operates at 32 Regional Offices in the country. It has in the process partnered with about 4000 partner organisations in grounding many of the interventions be it, SHG-Bank Linkage programme, tree-based tribal communities’ livelihoods initiative, watershed approach in soil and water conservation, increasing crop productivity initiatives through lead crop initiative or dissemination of information flow to agrarian communities through Farmer clubs. Despite all this, it pays huge taxes too, to the exchequer – figuring in the top 50 tax payers consistently. NABARD virtually ploughs back all the profits for development spending, in their unending search for solutions and answers. Thus the organisation had developed a huge amount of trust capital in its 3 decades of work with rural communities.

1.NABARD is the most important institution in the country which looks after the development of the cottage industry, small scale industry and village industry, and other rural industries.

2.NABARD also reaches out to allied economies and supports and promotes integrated development.

3.NABARD discharge its duty by undertaking the following roles:

Serves as an apex financing agency for the institutions providing investment and production credit for promoting the various developmental activities in rural areas
Takes measures towards institution building for improving absorptive capacity of the credit delivery system, including monitoring, formulation of rehabilitation schemes, restructuring of credit institutions, training of personnel, etc.
Co-ordinates the rural financing activities of all institutions engaged in developmental work at the field level and maintains liaison with Government of India, state governments, Reserve Bank of India (RBI) and other national level institutions concerned with policy formulation 
Undertakes monitoring and evaluation of projects refinanced by it.
NABARD refinances the financial institutions which finances the rural sector.
NABARD partakes in development of institutions which help the rural economy.
NABARD also keeps a check on its client institutes.
It regulates the institutions which provide financial help to the rural economy.
It provides training facilities to the institutions working in the field of rural upliftment.
It regulates and supervise the cooperative banks and the RRB's, throughout entire India.

NABARD has its head office at Mumbai, India and regional offices in all states and one special cell at Srinagar J&K. The Regional Office[RO] is headed by a Chief General Manager [CGMs] as Officer Incharge, and the Head office has several top executives viz the Directors, Deputy Managing Directors[DMD], and the Chairperson. The Board of Directors are appointed by the Government of India in consonance with NABARD Act. It has 336 District Offices across the country which are staffed by District Development Managers (DDMs). It also has six training establishments.

NABARD is also known for its 'SHG Bank Linkage Programme' which encourages India's banks to lend to self-help groups (SHGs). Largely because SHGs are composed mainly of poor women, this has evolved into an important Indian tool for microfinance. By March 2006, 22 lakh SHGs representing 3.3 crore members had to be linked to credit through this programme.

NABARD also has a portfolio of Natural Resource Management Programmes involving diverse fields like Watershed Development, Tribal Development and Farm Innovation through dedicated funds set up for the purpose.

Bank Regulation
NABARD supervises State Cooperative Banks (StCBs), District Cooperative Central Banks (DCCBs), and Regional Rural Banks (RRBs) and conducts statutory inspections of these banks.

Refinancing
NABARD's refinance fund from World Bank and Asian Development Bank  to state co-operative agriculture and rural development banks (SCARDBs), state co-operative banks (SCBs), regional rural banks (RRBs), commercial banks (CBs) and other financial institutions approved by RBI. While the ultimate beneficiaries of investment credit can be individuals, partnership concerns, companies, State-owned corporations or co-operative societies, production credit is generally given to individuals.

Rural innovation

NABARD role in rural development in India is phenomenal. National Bank For Agriculture & Rural Development (NABARD) is set up as an apex Development Bank by the Government of India with a mandate for facilitating credit flow for promotion and development of agriculture, cottage and village industries. The credit flow to agriculture activities sanctioned by NABARD reached Rs 1,57,480 crore in 2005–2006. The overall GDP is estimated to grow at 8.4 per cent. The Indian economy as a whole is poised for higher growth in the coming years. Role of NABARD in overall development of India in general and rural & agricultural in specific is highly pivotal.

Through assistance of Swiss Agency for Development and Cooperation, NABARD set up the Rural Innovation Fund. Rural Infrastructure Development Fund (RIDF) is another noted scheme for the bank for rural development. Under the RIDF scheme Rs. 51,283 crore have been sanctioned for 2,44,651 projects covering irrigation, rural roads and bridges, health and education, soil conservation, water schemes etc. Rural Innovation Fund is a fund designed to support innovative, risk friendly, unconventional experiments in these sectors that would have the potential to promote livelihood opportunities and employment in rural areas. The assistance is extended to Individuals, NGOs, Cooperatives, Self Help Group, and Panchayati Raj Institutions who have the expertise and willingness to implement innovative ideas for improving the quality of life in rural areas. Through member base of 25 crore, 600000 cooperatives are working in India at grass root level in almost every sector of economy. There are linkages between SHG and other type institutes with that of cooperatives.

The purpose of RIDF is to promote innovation in rural & agricultural sector through viable means. Effectiveness of the program depends upon many factors, but the type of organisation to which the assistance is extended is crucial one in generating, executing ideas in optimum commercial way. Cooperative is member driven formal organisation for socio-economic purpose, while SHG is informal one. NGO have more of social color while that of PRI is political one. Does the legal status of an institute influences effectiveness of the program? How & to what an extent? Cooperative type of organisation is better (Financial efficiency & effectiveness) in functioning (agriculture & rural sector) compared to NGO, SHG & PRIs.

Recently in 2007–08, NABARD has started a new direct lending facility under 'Umbrella Programme for Natural Resource Management' (UPNRM). Under this facility financial support for natural resource management activities can be provided as a loan at reasonable rate of interest. Already 35 projects have been sanctioned involving loan amount of about Rs 1000 crore. The sanctioned projects include honey collection by tribals in Maharashtra, tussar value chain by a women's producer company ('MASUTA'), eco-tourism in Karnataka etc.

References

Notes

External links

Official website

Agricultural organisations based in India
Rural development organisations in India
Financial services companies based in Mumbai
Agricultural finance in India
Regulatory agencies of India
Microfinance companies of India
1982 establishments in Maharashtra
Government agencies established in 1982